Vivien Joan Haddon now Vivien Boyd (born 14 August 1945) is a former swimming representative from New Zealand.

At the 1962 British Empire and Commonwealth Games, she won the silver medal in the women's 110 yards breaststroke. She also won the bronze medal in the 220 yards breaststroke.

Four years later at the 1966 British Empire and Commonwealth Games in Kingston, Jamaica, she won the bronze medal in the 220 yards breaststroke.

She competed at the 1964 Summer Olympics coming second in her heat of the 200 m breaststroke.

She was educated at Freyberg High School in Palmerston North.

References

1945 births
Living people
Olympic swimmers of New Zealand
Swimmers at the 1964 Summer Olympics
Commonwealth Games silver medallists for New Zealand
Commonwealth Games bronze medallists for New Zealand
New Zealand female swimmers
Swimmers at the 1962 British Empire and Commonwealth Games
Swimmers at the 1966 British Empire and Commonwealth Games
People educated at Freyberg High School
Commonwealth Games medallists in swimming
Sportspeople from Palmerston North
Medallists at the 1962 British Empire and Commonwealth Games
Medallists at the 1966 British Empire and Commonwealth Games